Mustafa Abd al-Qawi Abd al-Aziz al-Shamiri is a citizen of Yemen held in extrajudicial detention in the United States Guantanamo Bay detainment camps, in Cuba.
Al Shamiri's Guantanamo detainee ID number is 434.
The Department of Defense reports that Al Shamiri was born on July 7, 1978, in Sanaa, Yemen.

He was transferred to Oman with nine other men, on January 16, 2017.

Held due to mistaken identity

At his 2015 Periodic Review Board hearing, the DoD acknowledged that they had realized that Shamiri had been held due to a misidentification.
According to NBC News, Guantanamo analysts explained the identity confusion by admitting their colleagues had relied on "fragmentary reporting" that linked him to volunteering in the civil war that lead to Bosnian independence.
With regard to the more serious allegations that had been used to justify his detention, they now admitted: "we now judge that these activities were carried out by other known extremists".

In January 2016, he was "cleared for release".
This does not imply that he will actually be released; many other detainees that have been "cleared for release" have little prospect of ever obtaining their freedom.

Official status reviews

Originally the Bush Presidency asserted that captives apprehended in the "war on terror" were not covered by the Geneva Conventions, and could be held indefinitely, without charge, and without an open and transparent review of the justifications for their detention.
In 2004, the United States Supreme Court ruled, in Rasul v. Bush, that Guantanamo captives were entitled to being informed of the allegations justifying their detention, and were entitled to try to refute them.

Office for the Administrative Review of Detained Enemy Combatants

Following the Supreme Court's ruling the Department of Defense set up the Office for the Administrative Review of Detained Enemy Combatants.

Scholars at the Brookings Institution, led by Benjamin Wittes, listed the captives still held in Guantanamo in December 2008, according to whether their detention was justified by certain common allegations:

 Mustafa Abd al-Qawi Abd al-Aziz al-Shamiri was listed as one of the captives who "The military alleges ... are members of Al Qaeda."
 Mustafa Abd al-Qawi Abd al-Aziz al-Shamiri was listed as one of the captives who "The military alleges ... traveled to Afghanistan for jihad."
 Mustafa Abd al-Qawi Abd al-Aziz al-Shamiri was listed as one of the captives who "The military alleges that the following detainees stayed in Al Qaeda, Taliban or other guest- or safehouses."
 Mustafa Abd al-Qawi Abd al-Aziz al-Shamiri was listed as one of the captives who "The military alleges ... took military or terrorist training in Afghanistan."
 Mustafa Abd al-Qawi Abd al-Aziz al-Shamiri was listed as one of the captives who "The military alleges ... fought for the Taliban."
 Mustafa Abd al-Qawi Abd al-Aziz al-Shamiri was listed as one of the captives whose "names or aliases were found on material seized in raids on Al Qaeda safehouses and facilities."
 Mustafa Abd al-Qawi Abd al-Aziz al-Shamiri was listed as one of the captives who "The military alleges that the following detainees were captured under circumstances that strongly suggest belligerency."
 Mustafa Abd al-Qawi Abd al-Aziz al-Shamiri was listed as one of the captives who was an "al Qaeda operative".
 Mustafa Abd al-Qawi Abd al-Aziz al-Shamiri was listed as one of the "82 detainees made no statement to CSRT or ARB tribunals or made statements that do not bear materially on the military's allegations against them."

References

Yemeni extrajudicial prisoners of the United States
Detainees of the Guantanamo Bay detention camp
Living people
People from Sanaa
1978 births